TBJ is may refer to:
 Toronto Blue Jays, a Major League Baseball team
Law & Order: Trial by Jury, an American television drama
 Tabarka-Ain Draham International Airport, IATA airport code
 The Basketball Jones, a former sports blog on The Score covering the NBA